The 5.5 Metre was a sailing event in the sailing program of the 1956 Summer Olympics, held on Port Phillip. Seven races were scheduled. 33 sailors, on 10 boats, from 10 nations competed.

Results 

DNF = Did Not Finish, DNS= Did Not Start, DSQ = Disqualified 
 = Male,  = Female

Daily standings

Conditions on Port Phillip 

Three race areas were needed during the Olympics on Port Phillip. Each class used the same scoring system. The center course was used for the 5.5 Metre.

Notes

References 
 

 

5.5 Metre
5.5 Metre (keelboat)